Leopardstown, also historically called Ballinlore, is a small suburb of Dublin in Dún Laoghaire–Rathdown, within the traditional County Dublin, Ireland. Located at the foot of the Dublin Mountains, it is a residential suburb with institutional lands and a large racecourse. It is divided by the M50 motorway, and adjoins Sandyford, Stepaside, Ballyogan, Foxrock and Stillorgan.

Etymology and history
Leprosy was common in Dublin in the medieval period and in the 14th century St Stephen's Leper Hospital was built near St Stephen's Green. It was later moved out to the foothills of the Dublin Mountains to avoid infection spreading in the city. The area became known as Baile na Lobhar, "town of the lepers". This was anglicized as 'Ballinlore' and translated into English as 'Leperstown', eventually being corrupted to 'Leopardstown'.

Places of interest 
Places of interest in Leopardstown include Glencairn House (the residence of the British Ambassador to Ireland), Leopardstown Park Hospital, and Burton Hall, the childhood home of Hollywood actress Kathleen Ryan.

Sports 
The area is home to Leopardstown Racecourse, one of Ireland's main racecourses, along with the Curragh, as well as the Kilmacud Crokes' hurling pitch at Silverpark.

Culture 
Leopardstown is mentioned in the feature film Spy Kids, a road sign for Baile an Liopaird being seen outside Machete's shop. The Bob Geldof song "The House At The Top Of The World" includes the lyric "Soon I'd come to the Leopardstown dual carriageway ... I don't remember a town being there and I never saw no leopards."

Transport 
Leopardstown is served by five Luas Green Line stops: Central Park, Glencairn, The Gallops, Leopardstown Valley and Ballyogan Wood.

Dublin Bus routes 44, 47, 63, 114 and 118 serve Leopardstown. Aircoach route 700 links Leopardstown with Dublin Airport.

References 

 
Places in Dún Laoghaire–Rathdown
Towns and villages in Dún Laoghaire–Rathdown